Canton-Hackney Airport  is a city-owned public airport in Canton, Van Zandt County, Texas, United States, located about  north of the central business district. The airport has no IATA or ICAO designation. 

The airport is used solely for general aviation purposes.

Facilities 
(1,143 x 15 m), Surface: Asphalt

For the 12-month period ending 11 May 2016, the airport had 600 aircraft operations, an average of two per day, 100% general aviation. At that time, no aircraft were based at this airport.

References

External links 
 
  at Texas DOT Airport Directory

Airports in Texas
Transportation in Van Zandt County, Texas